Thanlwin Bridge (Mawlamyaing) was the longest bridge in Myanmar before the construction of Pakouku Bridge and connects the city of Mawlamyaing with Mottama. Constructed at the confluence of the Thanlwin River, the Gyaing River and the Attayan River in Mon State, the bridge has a two-mile (3 km)-long motor road and four-mile (6 km)-long railroad as well as pedestrian lanes.

The bridge was designed and built by Ministry of Construction.

See also
Rail transport in Myanmar
Myanmar Railways
Myanmar Longest and Largest Bridge

References

Bridges in Myanmar
Railway bridges in Myanmar
Buildings and structures in Mon State
Bridges completed in 2005
Road-rail bridges